Nicolás Emanuel Croce (born 22 July 1985) was an Argentine footballer. His last club was Ñublense.

References
 
 

1985 births
Living people
Argentine footballers
Argentine expatriate footballers
Tiro Federal footballers
Instituto footballers
Ñublense footballers
Aragua FC players
Chilean Primera División players
Argentine Primera División players
Expatriate footballers in Chile
Expatriate footballers in Venezuela
Association football midfielders
Sportspeople from Santa Fe Province
21st-century Argentine people